Dank Recovery is the username of a social media account known for its aggregation of online content and Internet memes about substance use disorders. Dank Recovery has over 700,000 Facebook followers, and over 50,00 Instagram followers. It was created by Timothy Kavanagh, a recovering heroin addict, in 2015 as an outlet for his own recovery.

Operations
In addition to Kavanagh, Dank Recovery has a total of 4 editors; Isaac, Jake, Jenny and Noah. Dank Recovery receives content submissions from all over the world. Dank Recovery is also known for using their presence on social media to help people get treatment for substance use disorders

Other Media
Kavanagh was a guest on Dopey (podcast) to talk about Dank Recovery's history, as well as his personal stories in addiction and creating recovery based humor.

References

External links 

 
 Famoid Instagram Followers

Social media accounts